"People Like Us" is a song by American singer Kelly Clarkson, from her first greatest hits album, Greatest Hits – Chapter One (2012). One of the three songs recorded for the compilation, it was released as its third and final single through RCA Records on April 8, 2013. Written by Meghan Kabir, James Michael, Blair Daly, and produced by Greg Kurstin, "People Like Us" is an uptempo pop song, with its lyrical content primarily dealing with themes of empowerment, acceptance, and assurance for the eccentrics, who were being dedicated to as "people like us".

Upon Chapter Ones release, "People Like Us" received positive reviews from music critics, many of whom complimented its lyrical content and Clarkson's vocal performance. In the United States, it peaked on the Billboard Hot 100 at number 65 and has topped the Hot Dance Club Songs chart. It also charted on the Adult Pop Songs and Pop Songs charts. Internationally, "People Like Us" attained a top forty position in the national charts of Canada, New Zealand, Slovakia, South Korea, and Ukraine.

Filmed by Chris Marrs Piliero, the accompanying music video for "People Like Us" is presented in a predominantly monochromatic atmosphere and featured Clarkson portraying an undercover scientist who furtively escapes an experimental subject with a full colored appearance into freedom. The video has met with positive reception from critics, who complimented its visual treatment and compared it to the 1998 film Pleasantville. Clarkson has performed the song in limited live performances, premiering it  on the twelfth season of American Idol.

Production and release 
Less than a year after the release of her fifth studio album, Stronger (2011), Clarkson began to record tracks with Greg Kurstin for a potential sixth studio album during the Labor Day weekend in 2012. She explained, "We're always working, I go overseas  and when I come back it's the holidays. I wanna make sure I have actual time off, so I like to get ahead of the game." Kurstin had previously collaborated with Clarkson for Stronger, producing the songs "Stronger (What Doesn't Kill You)", "Dark Side" and "Honestly". She remarked, "He has this whole jazz background, brings kind of a cool element to pop music. The cool thing about it is he gets in the studio and he doesn't have a formula. It's like everything could change."

One of the three songs recorded for Greatest Hits – Chapter One, along with "Catch My Breath" and "Don't Rush", "People Like Us" was written by Meghan Kabir, James Michael and Blair Daly, with production handled by Greg Kurstin. It marked the first time Michael, lead singer of the rock band Sixx:A.M., had co-written a single for a pop artist, having previously written songs for rock musicians such as Sixx:A.M., Meat Loaf, and Papa Roach. On November 14, 2012, five days ahead of Chapter Ones release, the song premiered online on Clarkson's YouTube channel.

 Composition 

"People Like Us" is a pop anthem with a length of four minutes and 20 seconds, a radio edit of it omits a part of the final chorus. The track begins with a spoken word intro and opens into an up-tempo pop melody, with its lyrics mainly exploring the themes of assurance, empowerment, celebration for the eccentrics and outcasts, which were dedicated by Clarkson as "people like us".

The song is performed in the key of E minor with a tempo of 128 beats per minute in common time.  It follows a chord progression of Em–G–Bm–A, and Clarkson's vocals span from D4 to E5.

 Reception 
 Critical response 
The single received generally favorable reviews from critics. Carl Williott of Idolator wrote in a review, "'People Like Us' showcases Kelly’s ability to turn frustration into uplifting (and danceable) catharsis. With lines like 'We are all misfits livin' in a world on fire,' it’s another colossal, fist-in-the-air pop anthem from Clarkson." Andy Scott of Celebuzz also wrote a positive review, remarking: "the latest single from the Grammy-winning superstar is exactly what we've come to expect from her: infectious beats; uplifting lyrics; and a powerful chorus that reminds one of her past hits like "Since U Been Gone" and "Stronger (What Doesn't Kill You)".  Multiple music critics also considered it to be a gay anthem. Zara Golden of VH1 compared the song's lyrical theme to Lady Gaga's "Born This Way" (2011), but also noted that "Clarkson is an old expert at spinning hope from hard times and this is the perfect final entry to Clarkson’s 'Chapter One.'"

 Chart performance 
Upon the release week of Chapter One, digital sales of "People Like Us" resulted in it entering the South Korean singles chart at number 14. Following its release as a single, the song entered the Billboard Adult Pop Songs chart at number 30 and on the Hot Dance Club Songs at number 32, and peaked at number 7 and number 1, respectively. It was Clarkson's fourth straight pop single to top the Hot Dance Club Songs chart and further extended her record as the top female solo artist on Adult Top 40 radio. It also debuted on the Pop Songs chart at number 36 and peaked at number 28. On the week ending June 1, 2013, "People Like Us" debuted on the Hot 100 chart at number 99, and peaked at number 65. As of September 2017, it has sold over 526,000 digital downloads in the United States. In Canada, "People Like Us" debuted on the Canadian Hot 100 at number 66, and peaked at number 28. In New Zealand, it debuted on the NZ Top 40 chart at number 37 on February 4, 2013 and peaked at number 25.

Music video
Concept and synopsis

The accompanying music video for "People Like Us" was directed by Chris Marrs Piliero. Filmed on April 9, 2013 at Mission Street Laboratories in South Pasadena, California, it utilizes a 2.39:1 anamorphic format (similar to "Catch My Breath"). A twenty-second preview of the video was broadcast on E! News on May 24, 2013, with the full video premiering on VEVO on May 28, 2013. The video utilizes several special effects shots, including the use of chroma key compositing and computer-generated imagery. In the video, Clarkson portrays a scientist breaking away from a monochromatic atmosphere and into a colorful one, accompanied with a young girl in full color.

The video, which uses the radio edit of the song,  begins with a footage of Clarkson performing, alternating with scenes of her joining a group of scientists examining a young girl (played by twins Rebecca & Vanessa Rogers) in a research facility. The scenes in the facility were presented in black-and-white form, with the exception of the young girl being presented in full color to distinguish her in a drab, monochromatic world. Throughout the chorus, Clarkson furtively takes snapshots of the girl using a Nokia Lumia 920, an example of product placements used in the video. She then sneaks into the girl's holding cell and lets her wipe a part of her face, revealing a colored look. The two try to escape the facility while being chased by its guards. Riding in a red BMW Z4 while being followed, the two, Clarkson now in full color, drive through a tunnel with a bright light at the end. At the tunnel's end, the guards try apprehend them, but were stopped in flabbergast when other people in full color intervene and after discovering a world changing from black-and-white into color. The video zooms out to show a fractal landscape terrain and ends with a shot of Clarkson singing the last line, now revealing a full colored appearance.

Reception
The video received positive reviews from various critics, with many of them comparing the video's monochromatic treatment to the 1998 film Pleasantville. Emily Blake of MTV wrote that "Clarkson reminds her fans that differences really are what makes the world colorful." Courtney Smith of CBS Radio compared the final scene of the video to The Wonderful Wizard of Oz. She also wrote, "This sort of cinematic setting is nothing unusual for the director Piliero, although we've never seen him interconnect so many influences in one video before." Paul Duren of The Dallas Morning News wrote in his review, "The video is one of Kelly’s most creative ones, and with the most ads too. You can see Nokia and BMW getting the "in your face" treatment, but it really doesn't take much away from the video. All in all, the video gives a clear representation of the song and drives the point of the song home." Jayvee from The Round Table also pointed out a similar review, he wrote, "Aside from the insane amount of product placements (Nokia Windows Phone, BMW, etc.), which is new territory for Clarkson, the overall video concept and message behind the song is pretty damn cool." The video received a nomination for a MTV Video Music Award for Best Video with a Message at the 2013 MTV Video Music Awards.

 Live performances 
Clarkson debuted "People Like Us" on the twelfth season of American Idol on April 11, 2013. It was later covered by the contestants as a group performance during the fourteenth season episode, "Evening with Kelly Clarkson."

 Formats and track listing Digital download – Remixes EPDigital download – SingleDigital download – EP Credits and personnel 
Credits adapted from the Greatest Hits – Chapter One liner notes.Personnel'''

 Lead Vocals – Kelly Clarkson
 Backing Vocals – Ashley Donovan, Bryan Jones, Chris Dye, Chris Michaelessi, Chris Rodriguez, Einar Pedersen, Jill Pickering, Jim Fredley, Kate Rapier, Miles McPherson, Nicole Hurst, Robert Miller
 Engineering – Greg Kurstin, Jesse Shatkin
 Engineering for Mixing – John Hanes

 Assistant Engineering – Phil Seaford
 Mixing – Serban Ghenea
 Production, Programming, Bass, and Guitar – Greg Kurstin
 Production Manager – Jason Halbert
 Recording – Lee Buddle
 Songwriting – Blair Daly, James Michael, Meghan Kabir

 Chart performance 

 Chart 

Year-end charts

 Radio and release history 

Cover versions
In 2019, the song was covered in the episode "Danny Patrol" from the first season of the television series Doom Patrol'', performed by Matt Bomer and Alan Mingo Jr.

See also 
 List of number-one dance singles of 2013 (U.S.)

References 

2012 songs
2013 singles
Kelly Clarkson songs
RCA Records singles
Music videos directed by Chris Marrs Piliero
Song recordings produced by Greg Kurstin
Songs written by Blair Daly
Songs written by James Michael
Songs about bullying
Sony Music singles
Dance-pop songs